The 1913 Cornell Big Red football team was an American football team that represented Cornell University during the 1913 college football season.  In their second season under head coach Albert Sharpe, the Big Red compiled a 5–4–1 record and outscored all opponents by a combined total of 132 to 89.  Two Cornell players received honors on Walter Camp's 1913 College Football All-America Team: tackle Jimmie Munns (third team); and end W. H. Fritz (second team).

Schedule

References

Cornell
Cornell Big Red football seasons
Cornell Big Red football